Sheikhpura is a census town in sheikhpura district in the Indian state of Bihar.

Demographics
 India census, Shekhpura had a population of 1,932. Males constitute 53% of the population and females 47%. Shekhpura has an average literacy rate of 68%, higher than the national average of 59.5%: male literacy is 75%, and female literacy is 61%. In Shekhpura, 12% of the population is under 6 years of age.

References

Cities and towns in Patiala district